The following is a list of winners and nominees in French-language categories for the Trillium Book Award, a Canadian literary award presented by Ontario Creates to honour books published by writers resident in the province of Ontario. Separate awards have been presented for English-language literature since 1994; for the winners and nominees in English-language categories, see Trillium Book Award, English.

From 1994 to 2002, a single annual award was presented for French-language books regardless of genre; in 2002, an award for best first book of poetry was introduced for francophone poets, but was only presented once, and established poets were still considered for the main all-genre award. 

In 2003, the award was fully split into separate categories for prose and poetry; however, in the second year of the poetry categories, the program failed to receive a sufficient number of submissions to present a French-language poetry award. The prize money that had been earmarked for the French poetry category was instead used that year to create an academic scholarship for French-language creative writing students in Ontario, and the category was further adjusted so that it now encompasses a two-year eligibility period instead of one, and alternates with a two-year category for French-language children's literature.

All-genre (1994-2002)

Prose (2003-present)

Poetry or children's (2002-present)

References

Ontario awards
Canadian children's literary awards
Canadian poetry awards
Canadian fiction awards
Canadian non-fiction literary awards